Veld ( or ), also spelled veldt, is a type of wide open rural landscape in :Southern Africa. Particularly, it is a flat area covered in grass or low scrub, especially in the countries of South Africa, Lesotho, Eswatini, Zimbabwe and Botswana. A certain sub-tropical woodland ecoregion of Southern Africa has been officially defined as the Bushveld by the World Wide Fund for Nature. Trees are not abundant—frost, fire and grazing animals allow grass to grow but prevent the build-up of dense foliage.

Etymology
The word veld comes from the Afrikaans word for "field".

The etymological origin is older modern Dutch veldt, a spelling that the Dutch abandoned in favour of veld during the 19th century, decades before the first Afrikaans dictionary. A cognate to the English field, it was spelt velt in Middle Dutch and felt in Old Dutch.

Climate

The climate of the veld is highly variable, but its general pattern is mild winters from May to September and hot or very hot summers from November to March, with moderate or considerable variations in daily temperatures and abundant sunshine. Precipitation mostly occurs in the summer months in the form of high-energy thunderstorms.

Temperature is closely related to elevation.

Temperatures are slightly higher than in South Africa.

Over the entire veld, seasonal and annual average rainfall variations of up to 40 percent are common. Damaging drought affects at least half the area about once every three or four years; it reduces plant and animal biomass to sustainable levels again. Everywhere the average number of hours of annual sunshine varies from 60 to 80 percent of the total amount possible.

Definitions 
Veld can be loosely compared to the Australian terms outback or "the bush", to the prairie of North America, to the pampas lowlands of South America, or the steppe of Central Asia. Someone from Yorkshire might equate "wandering across the moors" to "walking through the veld."

By extension, the veld can be compared to the "boondocks" or those places "beyond the black stump" in Australia. There is a sense in which it refers in essence to unimproved land (and is therefore not the equivalent of the English paddock) and does not include areas used both for pastoral activities and the planting of crops. These areas are referred to as "fields". The word is less appropriate for land that is heavily forested, mountainous, or urban. The simplest explanation will be to say the word "veld" means "natural vegetation", excluding vegetation like swamps and forests. It does include mountains with vegetation but not deserts or mountains without natural vegetation.

The veld definition may encompass different natural environments, both humid and dry, such as coastal plain, coastal prairie, flooded grasslands and savannas, grassland, prairie, savanna, steppe, meadow, water-meadow, flood-meadow, wet meadow, as well as agricultural fields.
Whereas mountainous peaks and thick forests do not really fit in with the term veld, bushes are acceptable. The area then becomes bushveld, a term that is used mainly to describe "The Bushveld", which is both a loose botanical classification and a specific geographical part of what used to be known as the Transvaal, as described for example in the story Jock of the Bushveld.

Other uses
The word renosterveld, "rhinoceros-field", is now used to differentiate one of the major vegetation types of the Cape Floristic Region.
A carefully husbanded sports field on which the game of rugby is played in the middle of cities such as Cape Town or Johannesburg is referred to as a "rugbyveld" in the Afrikaans language.
The word "veld" also carries military connotations. The word "field" in English has a strong association with "war", as evidenced by the expression "the first foe in the field" and the lines of the ballad 'Lord Marlborough' (see John Churchill): "You generals all and champions bold, that takes delight in field, that knocks down churches and castle walls but now to death must yield". The same relationship is paralleled in Afrikaans. Just as the English army has its field marshals, the Boer armies had their Veldkornets and Veldkommandos.

Highveld and Lowveld

Highveld 

Much of the interior of Southern Africa consists of a high plateau, the higher portions  of which are known as the Highveld, starting at the Drakensberg escarpment,  to the east of Johannesburg and sloping gradually downwards to the west and south west, as well as to the north, through the Bushveld towards the Limpopo river.
To the east, the Highveld's border is marked by the Great Escarpment, or the Mpumalanga Drakensberg, but in the other directions the boundary is not obvious and often arbitrary. The blesbok and quagga were among the large animals that once roamed on the highveld in great numbers. Nowadays there still is a sizeable population of springbok in some areas, though much of the area is devoted to Balls farming and South Africa's largest conurbation (Gauteng Province).

Lowveld 
The lowlands, below about  altitude, along South Africa's northern border with Botswana and Zimbabwe, where a 180-million-year-old failed rift valley cuts into Southern Africa's central plateau and locally obliterates the Great Escarpment, is known as the Lowveld. The Limpopo and Save rivers run from the central African highlands via the Lowveld into the Indian Ocean to the east. The Limpopo Lowveld extends southwards, east of the Drakensberg escarpment through Mpumalanga Province and ultimately into eastern Eswatini. This southern limb of the Lowveld is bounded by South Africa's border with Mozambique to the east and the north-eastern part of the Drakensberg to the west. This region is generally hotter and less intensely cultivated than the Highveld.

Thornveld 
Thornveld (also thorn veld or thornveldt), often referred to as "acacia thornveld", is a type of semi-arid savanna in which grassland with thorny acacia and certain species of thorny bushes predominate. The predominant plant species are usually different in the thornveld of the plains or in the hill thornveld, where, for example, species of genus Balanites are common. Some of the characteristic species in the thornveld include:
Grasses: Grass species belonging to genus Themeda and Hyparrhenia
Trees and bushes: Genus Acacia and Rhus, such as Acacia caffra, Acacia sieberiana and Rhus pentheri and other species like Ziziphus mucronata, Ehretia rigida and Cussonia spicata.

Sandveld and Hardveld

Sandveld 
Sandveld, in the general sense of the word, is a type of veld characterised by dry, sandy soil, typical of certain areas of the Southern African region. It usually absorbs all water from the seasonal rains, although aquatic habitats, largely seasonal, may be also found in specific places in the sandveld. Only certain hardy plant species thrive in the sandveld environment. These consist especially of grasses forming clumps and certain kinds of trees and shrubs. The sandveld vegetation has a particular pattern of growth, rarely covering the whole terrain and thus leaving patches of sandy soil exposed on the surface. Some of the typical sandveld species are Acacia haematoxylon, A. luederitzii, Boscia albitrunca, Terminalia sericea, Lonchocarpus nelsii, Bauhinia petersiana and Baphia massaiensis.

Hardveld 
Hardveld is a term applied to certain areas of rocky soils in Botswana, located mostly in the eastern part of the country. The landscape is an undulating plain with scattered rocky hill ranges. There are areas of hardveld also in South Africa in the mountainous central Kamiesberg of the Northern Cape with hilly escarpments and deep river valleys. The soil of the hardveld is characterised by rocky outcrops, as well as an abundance of stones and pebbles of different shapes and sizes.

The flora of the hardveld is typical of rocky savanna, with denser vegetation and thus less denuded patches than in the sandveld, as well as taller trees. There is also a higher diversity of species in the hardveld compared with the sandveld. Peltophorum africanum, Acacia nigrescens, A. tortilis, Combretum apiculatum and Colophospermum mopane are some of the representative species of the northern hardveld.

See also 

Bushveld
Highveld
Kruger National Park
Lowveld
Outback
Pasture
Plain
Rangeland

References

External links 

Plains of Africa
South African English
Grasslands
Grasslands of Africa
Grasslands of South Africa
Karoo
Afrikaans words and phrases
Geography of South Africa
Geography of Lesotho
Geography of Eswatini
Geography of Zimbabwe
Geography of Botswana
Geography of Namibia
Ecoregions